USS Manatee has been the name of two United States Navy vessels and may refer to either one of the following:

 , a speedboat that served as a patrol boat during World War I. 
 , a replenishment oiler in commission from 1944 to 1973.

United States Navy ship names